The FIS Cup (ski jumping) is a series of ski jumping competitions arranged yearly by the International Ski Federation. It is considered the third level of international ski jumping, ranking below the World Cup and the Continental Cup. Most of the events are held on normal hills, with a construction point of 90 meters. Jumpers rarely compete the entire season in the FIS Cup. If a jumper performs well in the FIS Cup, he is often moved up to the Continental Cup. Men's circuit was introduced in 2005/06 and women started their first season in 2012/13

Higher competitive circuits are the World Cup, the Summer Grand Prix and the Continental Cup; the lower circuits include the FIS Race and the Alpen Cup.

Standings

Men

Women

References
 | FIS Cup Rules
 FIS Cup standings

 
Ski jumping competitions
Cup